Triploid block is a phenomenon describing the formation of nonviable progeny after hybridization of flowering plants that differ in ploidy. The barrier is established in the endosperm, a nutritive tissue supporting embryo growth. This phenomenon usually happens when autopolyploidy occurs in diploid plants. Triploid blocks lead to reproductive isolation. The triploid block effects have been explained as possibly due to genomic imprinting in the endosperm.

References

Botany
Evolution